William Webster (June 1, 1896 – death unknown) was an American Negro league catcher between 1915 and 1933. 

A native of Atlanta, Georgia, Webster made his Negro leagues debut in 1915 with the St. Louis Giants. He went on to enjoy a long career with several teams, and made his final appearance in 1933 for the Indianapolis ABCs/Detroit Stars.

References

External links
 and Baseball-Reference Black Baseball stats and Seamheads

1896 births
Year of death missing
Place of death missing
Bacharach Giants players
Chicago American Giants players
Dayton Marcos players
Detroit Stars players
Indianapolis ABCs players
Indianapolis ABCs (1931–1933) players
Lincoln Giants players
St. Louis Giants players
Baseball catchers